Hymenistatin is a cyclic peptide isolated from the sea sponge Phakellia fusca. It is a cyclic octapeptide whose sequence is cyclo[Ile-Ile-Pro-Pro-Tyr-Val-Pro-Leu].

References

Cyclic peptides